Ignacio "Nacho" Beristáin (born July 31, 1939, in Actopan, Veracruz, Mexico) is a Mexican trainer in the sport of boxing. Beristain is a member of the Boxing Hall of Fame and is considered one of the greatest trainers in the history of boxing.

Training career
Beristain boxed as an amateur in the light flyweight division. He later turned professional, but was forced to retire prematurely in 1959 due to an eye injury. After retirement, he co-managed Vicente Saldivar. As a trainer in the amateur ranks, he led Mexico's boxing teams to multiple medal wins at the 1968, 1976 and 1980 Olympic Games. His first professional world champion was two-division title holder and hall of famer Daniel Zaragoza. He has trained several other notable boxers, including hall of fame member brothers Juan Manuel Márquez and Rafael Márquez and other fellow hall of famers, such as Ricardo López, Gilberto Román, and Humberto "Chiquita" González, having trained them from their initial careers to the top of the pound for pound rankings.  He also had a brief stint in training Oscar De La Hoya when De La Hoya faced Manny Pacquiao in December 2008.

Boxers Trained
Ricardo López - four-time champion (hall of fame member)
Juan Manuel Márquez - four division champion (hall of fame member)
Rafael Márquez - two division champion (hall of fame)
Daniel Zaragoza - four-time champion (hall of fame member)
Humberto González - four-time champion (hall of fame member)
Victor Rabanales - bantamweight champion
Oscar De La Hoya - six division champion
Jorge Arce -  four-time champion
Guty Espadas - flyweight champion
Guty Espadas, Jr. - featherweight champion
Alfredo Angulo - jr middleweight prospect
Enrique Sánchez - bantamweight champion
Gilberto Román - two-time champion (with 11 title defenses)
Jhonny González - two division champion
Melchor Cob Castro - two-time champion
Rodolfo López - featherweight champion
Alejandro Barrera - jr middleweight prospect
Abner Mares - three division champion 
Vicente Escobedo - former title challenger
Juan Carlos Salgado - two-time champion
Jorge Paez  - two-time champion
Julio César Chávez Jr. - middleweight champion
Rey Vargas - two division champion

Boxing Hall of Fame
In 2006, Beristáin became a member of the World Boxing Hall of Fame as a trainer. Then on December 7, 2010, he was inducted to the International Boxing Hall of Fame, alongside legendary Mexican champion Julio César Chávez, Russian Australian Undisputed Junior Welterweight World Champion, Kostya Tszyu, heavyweight champion Mike Tyson, and actor Sylvester Stallone.

References

People from Veracruz
People from Mexico City
Mexican boxing trainers
International Boxing Hall of Fame inductees
1939 births
Living people